Alina Popescu (born 27 October 1985) is a Romanian female triple jumper, who won an individual gold medal at the Youth World Championships.

References

External links

1985 births
Living people
Romanian female triple jumpers